Copper Bell Bed and Breakfast, also known as Las Piedras Rest Home, is located in Tucson, Arizona, United States.  It was built in 1910 and was listed on the National Register of Historic Places in 1992.

It was a sanatarium.

It is operated as a Bed and Breakfast inn. "Circa 1907. Uniquely constructed of lava stone, this home includes an old copper bell brought from a German church."

References

Bed and breakfasts in the United States
Buildings and structures in Tucson, Arizona
Tuberculosis sanatoria in the United States
Hospital buildings completed in 1910
Hospital buildings on the National Register of Historic Places in Arizona
National Register of Historic Places in Tucson, Arizona
1910 establishments in Arizona Territory